The committees of the European Parliament are designed to aid the European Commission in initiating legislation.

Standing committees are made up of Members of the European Parliament (MEPs), who are directly elected to the seats in the European Parliament by the electorate. Each committee has a chairman and four vice-chairmen, along with numerous committee members. Each committee also has substitute members.

Reports are usually compiled by a rapporteur, who is appointed by the chairman of the committee, selected from amongst the members or permanent substitutes.

Appointment
The established system for the appointment of committee chairs follows the D'Hondt method.

Legislative reports
In the process of proposing and drafting legislation, the European Commission will consult the various standing committees during the codecision procedure, and these committees will advise the commission by producing reports, proposing amendments to the draft legislation, and providing, if necessary, a drafted legislative resolution.

In the event of at least one-tenth of the members objecting to any particular amendment, the amendment will be put to a vote at the committee's next meeting.

Similarly, unless at least one-tenth of committee members object, committees can also pass legislation back to the commission without amendments.

Non-legislative reports
Committees are also able to produce non-legislative reports. The appointed rapporteur is responsible for preparing the report, and presenting it to Parliament on the committee's behalf. These reports must include a motion for a resolution, an explanatory statement, and must also outline financial implications.

Own-initiative reports
Committees can also produce reports relevant to their competence, without having to be consulted. These are called "Own-Initiative Reports", and are used to submit a motion for a resolution.

Before drawing up any such report, a committee must obtain the permission of the Conference of Presidents. The Conference of Presidents has two months to make a decision, and any reasons for withholding permission must always be stated.

Cross-committee co-operation
When drawing up a report, a committee may ask the opinion of another committee on the matter, particularly if it is felt that a proposed amendment would fall into the interests of another committee. The committee asked for an opinion will be named as such in the final report. The chairman and draftsman of the secondary committee may be invited to take part in any committee discussions held by the primary committee, where the meeting deals with the matter that the secondary committee is advising on.

Amendments that are proposed by the secondary committee will be voted on by the committee responsible for producing the report.

If the Conference of Presidents decides that a requested report falls equally to two committees, both committees will agree upon a joint timetable, and shall work together in producing the report.

List of standing committees
This is a list of standing committees along with the respective chairperson as of January 2022.

Temporary committees
Under Rules 175 and 176 the European Parliament may at any time set up temporary committees for specific reports for an initial period of no longer than 12 months. Examples of such temporary committees have been:
 The temporary committee on the Echelon interception system
 The temporary committee on the alleged use of European countries by the CIA for the transport and illegal detention of prisoners.
 The temporary committee of Inquiry into the crisis of The Equitable Life Assurance Society.

On 25 April 2007 MEPs voted to set up a temporary committee on climate change. The committee will have a year to come up with proposals on the EU's future integrated climate-change policy, to co-ordinate the EP's position in this field, to assess the latest evidence on climate change and to evaluate the cost of action.

Following the 2009 elections, in light of the Late 2000s recession, Parliament set up a Special Committee on the Financial, Economic and Social Crisis.

Delegations
MEPs also compose delegations to various Parliaments outside of the European Union. Joint parliamentary committees are set up with candidate countries. There are also delegations to the ACP–EU Joint Parliamentary Assembly, the Euro-Latin American Parliamentary Assembly the Euronest Parliamentary Assembly and the Euro-Mediterranean Parliamentary Assembly.

Conference of Committee Chairs and Conference of Delegation Chairs
Two major bodies in the Parliament are the Conference of Committee Chairs (CCC) and the Conference of Delegation Chairs (CDC). The Conference of Committee Chairs is the political body in Parliament that works for better cooperation between the committees and consists of the chairs of all the standing and special committees.
The Conference of Delegation Chairs is the political body in Parliament that periodically considers all matters concerning the smooth running of interparliamentary delegations and delegations to the joint parliamentary committees. 
They may make recommendations to the Conference of Presidents and can be instructed to carry out particular tasks by the Bureau or Conference of Presidents.

References

External links
 Official Website
 Lists of MEPs by committee membership
 Rules of Procedure of the European Parliament
 List of delegations on EP website

 
European Parliament